Sarah Lawrence College is a private liberal arts college in Yonkers, New York. The college models its approach to education after the Oxford/Cambridge system of one-on-one student-faculty tutorials. A Sarah Lawrence scholarship, particularly in the humanities, performing arts, and writing, places high value on independent study. Originally a women's college, Sarah Lawrence became coeducational in 1968.

History

Establishment and development (20th century) 
Sarah Lawrence College was established in 1926 by the real-estate mogul William Van Duzer Lawrence on the grounds of his estate in Westchester County and was named in honor of his wife, Sarah Bates Lawrence. The college was originally intended to provide instruction in the arts and humanities for women. A major component of the college's early curriculum was "productive leisure", wherein students were required to work for eight hours weekly in such fields as modeling, shorthand, typewriting, applying makeup, and gardening. Its pedagogy, modeled on the tutorial system of Oxford University, combined independent research projects, individually supervised by the teaching faculty, and seminars with low student-to-faculty ratio, a pattern that it retains to the present, despite its cost. Sarah Lawrence was the first liberal arts college in the United States to incorporate a rigorous approach to the arts with the principles of progressive education, focusing on the primacy of teaching and the concentration of curricular efforts on individual needs.

Harold Taylor, President of Sarah Lawrence College from 1945 to 1959, greatly influenced the college. Taylor was elected president at age 30, maintained a friendship with the educational philosopher John Dewey, and worked to employ the Dewey method at Sarah Lawrence. Taylor spent much of his career calling for educational reform in the United States, using the success of Sarah Lawrence as an example of the possibilities of a personalized, modern, and rigorous approach to higher education.

Sarah Lawrence became a coeducational institution in 1968. Prior to this transition, there were discussions about relocating the school and merging it with Princeton University, but the administration opted to remain independent.

Larry Ray scandal (2010)
In 2010, Lawrence V. "Larry" Ray, born Lawrence Grecco (then 50), following his release from prison, resided in the on-campus apartment of his daughter, Talia Ray. Sarah Lawrence College later told New York magazine that it was not aware that he had been living on campus. While there, Ray started a sex cult in which he presented himself to students as a psychologist and spiritual advisor; in 2011, he induced some students to move into his apartment in nearby New York City.

In February 2020, he was charged by prosecutors in Manhattan with conspiracy, extortion, sex trafficking, forced labor, and other related offenses, following nearly 10 years of alleged transgressions with students and former students. At a bail hearing held March 2, 2020, an Assistant U.S. Attorney disclosed to the Manhattan federal court that Ray had been arrested while in bed with one of his victims. Bail was denied. Defense attorneys argued Ray, who was diagnosed with narcissistic personality disorder and histrionic personality disorder, was influenced by his psychological problems. Ray was convicted on all counts on April 6, 2022. On January 20, 2023 he was sentenced to 60 years in prison.

College presidents

The first president of the college was Marion Coats from 1924 to 1929. She was a friend of Vassar College president Henry MacCracken and William Van Duzer Lawrence. Coats had traditional views of women's role in society that were at odds with her progressive approach to women's education. Cristle Collins Judd was introduced as president in 2017.

Academics
At the undergraduate level, Sarah Lawrence offers an alternative to traditional majors. Students pursue a wide variety of courses in four different curricular distributions: the Creative Arts (writing, music, dance, theatre, film, and the plastic arts, such as painting, printmaking, drawing and sculpture); history and the social sciences (e.g., anthropology, economics, political science, and sociology); the humanities (e.g., Asian studies, art history, film studies, languages, literature, philosophy, and religion); and natural science and mathematics (biology, chemistry, physics, computer science, and mathematics). Classes are structured around a seminar-conference system through which students learn in small, highly interactive seminars and private tutorials with professors. Each student is assigned to a faculty advisor, known as a "don", who helps the student plan a course of study and provides ongoing academic guidance. Most courses, apart from those in the performing arts, consist of two parts: the seminar, limited to 15 students, and conferences, which is a meeting with a seminar professor. In these conferences, students develop individual projects that extend the course material and link it to their personal interests. Sarah Lawrence has no required courses, and traditional examinations have largely been supplanted by research papers. Additionally, grades are recorded only for transcript purposes—narrative evaluations are given in lieu of grades. The college sponsors international programs in Florence, at Wadham College, Oxford, at Reid Hall in Paris, and at the British American Drama Academy in London. Sarah Lawrence also has the longest-running study abroad program in Havana, Cuba. Accordingly, all of its 318 undergraduate degrees for 2022 were awarded in Liberal Arts and Sciences/Liberal Studies.

Sarah Lawrence also offers Master's-level programs in Writing, the Art of Teaching, Child Development, Theatre, Dance, and Dance/Movement Therapy and is home to the nation's oldest graduate program in Women's History and the nation's first master's degree programs in Human Genetics and Health Advocacy.

Sarah Lawrence offers a program for people wishing to seek a BA. or a Master's and have been out of school for any period.

Exchange programs
 Spelman College Exchange Program: Beginning in spring 2007, female students began participating in an exchange program with Spelman College in Atlanta, Georgia.
 Pitzer College Exchange Program
 Kansai Gaidai University (Asian Studies Program) Osaka, Japan
 Tsuda University (Private Women's University) Tokyo, Japan

International programs
The college has a number of international programs in four countries. Sarah Lawrence makes all practical efforts to preserve its most characteristic elements, such as one-on-one interaction with professors, small classes, and an emphasis on qualitative comprehension, in its programs overseas.
 Havana: In place since 2000, this program is the longest-running in Cuba by an American university. The course offerings at the University of Havana include Afro-Cuban culture, art history, Cuban or Latin American cinema, Cuban history, Latin American studies, literature, psychology, urban and rural sociology, U.S.-Cuban relations, and women's studies. All courses are taught by Cuban faculty and are attended by Cuban students. Each student is also required to enroll in an advanced Spanish course. The most distinctive feature is an affiliation with Centro de Estudios Demográficos (CEDEM), one of the research centers at the University of Havana. At CEDEM students meet with experts whose research and professional expertise focus on developments in contemporary Cuban society. Students select a research topic and are paired with a professor from CEDEM with whom they meet on a regular basis, much like the regular conference structure.
 London: Jointly sponsored by the British American Drama Academy and Sarah Lawrence College, the program expands Sarah Lawrence's long-standing and vibrant tradition in the performing arts by exposing students to the rigors of professional British training in acting. The faculty includes some of Britain's most distinguished actors and directors. The heart of each student's program is scene study in classical and modern works. Students also take courses in voice, movement, and stage fighting and participate in fully staged performances at the end of each term.
 Oxford: Since 1985, Sarah Lawrence College has been associated with Wadham College, one of the undergraduate colleges of Oxford University in England. This program is open to select juniors and seniors. Students are best prepared to undertake the demands of Oxford if their coursework in their first and sophomore years have included significant analytical and written work.
 Leeds: Students who are admitted into the University of Leeds program have access to a variety of disciplines and academic strengths. The academic year runs from September through the end of May and is made up of two semesters. Students will take a combination of lectures, seminars, and tutorials, with additional time for private study, labs (sciences) and fieldwork. Students will meet with a Sarah Lawrence program advisor in determining their course of study each semester.
 Paris: Centered at historic Reid Hall in the Montparnasse quarter of Paris, the program is Sarah Lawrence's oldest and focuses on the humanities and creative arts. The program is conducted entirely in French and includes one required French-language class and three other courses of the student's choosing. Classes may be taken at the University of Paris, Institut d'Etudes Politiques, the Ecole du Louvre, and the Institut Catholique, or other, more specialized institutions.

Graduate programs
Sarah Lawrence offers nine graduate programs, each of which confers the Master of Arts, Master of Fine Arts, or Master of Science degree upon its graduates. In contrast to highly specialized, research-oriented PhD doctoral study, these programs reflect the emphasis on interdisciplinary studies and the close student-teacher relationship that have come to be characteristic of the college's undergraduate program. Intensive work with faculty members, small seminars, and one-on-one conferences form the foundation of the curricular model. According to their own literature, the programs make an effort to balance the "theoretical (usually discussed in seminars and conferences) with the practical (in the form of fieldwork, practicums, research or creative work). This experiential work is most often conducted not in isolation, but in the midst of a community. Interdisciplinary work and ideas are encouraged, as is an ethic of social responsibility." There are approximately 298 graduate students at Sarah Lawrence.

Art of Teaching
The Sarah Lawrence College Art of Teaching Program offers training in education in both degree-track and continuing education formats. One component of the program is the Empowering Teachers Program, which was established in 1989 as a forum for the support of teachers and educational administrators, and has since expanded into a resource and network for more than 250 beginning and experienced professionals from 25 school districts in Westchester County and adjacent areas of New York, Connecticut and New Jersey.

Rankings

In 2007, criticism of rankings of U.S. colleges and universities, particularly their perceived impact on the college admissions process, gained national prominence due in part to the March 11, 2007, Washington Post article "The Cost of Bucking College Rankings" by Michele Tolela Myers, a former president of Sarah Lawrence College. As Sarah Lawrence College dropped its SAT test score submission requirement for its undergraduate applicants in 2003, thus joining the SAT optional movement for undergraduate admission, the college does not have SAT data to send to U.S. News for its national survey. Of this decision, Myers states, "We are a writing-intensive school, and the information produced by SAT scores added little to our ability to predict how a student would do at our college; it did, however, do much to bias admission in favor of those who could afford expensive coaching sessions." At the time, Sarah Lawrence was the only American college that completely disregarded SAT scores in its admission process. As a result of this policy, in the same The Washington Post article, Dr. Myers stated that she was informed by the U.S. News & World Report that if no SAT scores were submitted, U.S. News would "make up a number" to use in its magazines. She further argues that if the college were to decide to stop sending all data to U.S. News & World Report, their ranking would be artificially decreased. Sarah Lawrence College now maintains a test-optional policy, with typically over half of applicants submitting their scores.

On June 19, 2007, following a meeting of the Annapolis Group, which represents over 100 liberal arts colleges, Sarah Lawrence announced that it would join others who had previously signed the letter to college presidents asking them not to participate in the "reputation survey" section of the U.S. News & World Report survey (this section comprises 25% of the ranking). Despite this public stance opposing these rankings, the 2019 edition ranked Sarah Lawrence tied for the 65th best liberal arts college in the nation.

In 2022, Forbes rated it 467th overall in its America's Top Colleges ranking, which includes 660 military academies, national universities, and liberal arts colleges. That same year, Washington Monthly rankings ranked Sarah Lawrence 155th in the liberal arts college category.

Political involvement and activism
Political activism has played a crucial role in forming the spirit of the Sarah Lawrence community since the early years of the college. As early as 1938, students were volunteering in working-class sections of Yonkers, New York to help bring equality and educational opportunities to poor and minority citizens, and the Sarah Lawrence College War Board, organized by students in the fall of 1942, sought to aid troops fighting in World War II. During a time when the college's enrollment consisted of only 293 students, 204 signed up as volunteers during the first week of the War Board. During the so-called McCarthy Years, a number of Sarah Lawrence's faculty members were accused by the American Legion of being sympathetic to the Communist Party, and were called before the Jenner Committee. Since that time, activism has played a central role in student life, with movements for civil rights and against the Vietnam War in the 1960s and for student and faculty diversity in the 1980s. Also in the 1960s, students established an Upward Bound program for students from lower-income and poverty areas to prepare for college. Theatre Outreach, the Child Development Institute, the Empowering Teachers Program, the Community Writers program, the Office of Community Partnership, and the Fulbright High School Writers Program are among the many programs founded since the 1970s to provide services to the larger community. In the late 1980s, students occupied Westlands, the main administrative building for the campus, in a sit-in for wider diversity. Students occupied Westlands again in 2016, in a sit-in supporting improved wages and safer working conditions for the college's recently unionized facilities workers. For many years, the college has been considered as being at the vanguard of the gay rights movement and many other progressive causes.

Campus

Much of the  Sarah Lawrence campus was originally a part of the estate of the college's founder, William Van Duzer Lawrence, though the college has more than doubled its size since Lawrence bequeathed his estate to the college in 1926. The terrain is characterized by dramatic outcroppings of exposed bedrock shaded by large oak and elm trees. Many of the older buildings are in the Tudor Revival architecture style that was popular in the area during the early 20th century, and many of the college's newer buildings attempt an updated interpretation of the same style. The campus is divided into two distinctive sections, the "Old Campus" and the "New Campus": the first is roughly contained within the boundaries of the former Lawrence estate, and the area of the second was acquired sometime after the college's earliest years.

The area outside the original Lawrence estate holds the college's newer facilities. Several stately, century-old, Tudor-style mansions will be found among these newer additions, including Andrews, Tweed, Lynd, Marshall Field, and Slonim House: each was once a private estate, purchased by the college during periods of growth and expansion. The more modest Tudor houses along Mead Way, which also had been private residences, now serve as dormitories for students at the college. "Slonim Woods" is a group of newer, townhouse-style dormitories, built on the grounds of Slonim House.

The Campbell Sports Center was constructed in 1998 in response to an increased focus on physical fitness and sports. This facility includes an indoor pool, gymnasium, track, squash courts, and weight rooms.

In 2004, the college completed construction of a modern visual arts facility, the Monika A. and Charles A. Heimbold Visual Arts Center, with sleek architecture and environmentally friendly aspects which earned the college national press attention. Just down the road is Hill House, a six-story apartment building purchased by the college in the late 1990s that now lodges students. Across the street from Hill House is the large Wrexham house, also in the Tudor style, which the college purchased from the government of Rwanda in 2004; this building, once home to the Rwandan consul, has been renovated and is used for various postgraduate programs. At the opposite end of the campus stands the Science and Mathematics Center, completed in 1994.

Buildings

Academic facilities
 The Barbara Walters Campus Center is the newest building on campus. Finished in the fall of 2019, the building is named for alumna Barbara Walters. The building boasts a flexible multipurpose space which is used for dances, speeches, class gatherings, etc. On the second floor is the Barbara Walters Reading Room. It includes a rotating exhibition, but currently holds artifacts from Barbara Walters' life. The building has a green roof energy efficient LED lighting.
 Bates Center for Student Life is one of the original campus buildings. A huge facility designed in the English Tudor style that is common in the area, it has housed not just offices and classrooms, but everything from maids' quarters to dining halls to laboratories and arts facilities. At one time, it was home to a miniature basketball court that is now a faculty dining room, though the lines of the court can still be seen on the floors. Over the years, programs in science, visual arts, and physical education have grown to the point that they have spilled over elsewhere on the campus, requiring three buildings of their own. Bates has always been home to the college's main dining facility and also houses the popular "Health Food Bar."
 The Esther Raushenbush Library, designed in 1974 by Walter, Burns, Toan & Lundein an architectural style meant to interpret in a more modern and sleek fashion the implied buttresses and strong features of its much older neighbor, Andrews House. The Raushenbush Library houses over 300,000 volumes.
 The Alice Stone Ilchman Science and Mathematics Center, completed in 1994, is situated on the far north end of the campus. It houses science laboratories in addition to classrooms and faculty offices. The building is named for former president Alice Stone Ilchman.
 The Marshall Field Music Building was originally created as part of William Lawrence's residential neighborhood, Lawrence Park West. Prior to the purchase, President Harold Taylor played his clarinet in several of the rooms to test the acoustics.
 The Monica A. and Charles A. Heimbold Visual Arts Center The building was designed by Polshek Partnership Architects. Completed in 2004, the building has garnered national press for its 'green' design. Relating to the college's stated goals, the building engages the landscape and existing campus circulation patterns, promotes student engagement through transparency, and takes a leadership role in sustainable design. The jury applauded its inventive use of materials; consistent development of the project in relation to the original concept; well-integrated plan/section; and exemplary use of building siting, solar orientation, daylighting, and locally quarried fieldstone to achieve LEED certification. The American Institute of Architects awarded a special 'Sustainable Architecture Honor Award' to the project as well as First Honor Awards at its 2005 "Celebration of Architecture".
 The Campbell Sports Center One of the newest buildings on campus, the Sports Center was completed in 1997 and houses a swimming pool, a rowing tank, a weight room and exercise center, an indoor running track, squash courts, a basketball court, classrooms, locker rooms, and administrative offices.
 The Charles DeCarlo Performing Arts Center, remodeled and greatly expanded in 1974, is a large facility on the western end of the South Lawn. Named for former College president Charles DeCarlo, the complex comprises the Bessie Schönberg Dance Theatre, the 200-seat Suzanne Werner Wright Theatre, the 400-seat Reisinger Auditorium, the 117-seat Cannon Workshop Theatre modeled after Shakespeare's Globe Theatre, and rehearsal spaces and work areas. The college bookstore is located in the PAC.
 The Ruth Leff Siegel Center, which is almost exclusively referred to as "The Pub", was originally constructed as a gardener's cottage on the Lawrence estate, then used as an infirmary and later as a faculty house. When the college began admitting male students in 1968, it became temporary housing for men. During the 1970s, the space was remodeled and christened "The Pub" for use as an informal dining hall and as a space for student activities. During the 1980s, it was renamed "Charlie's Place", honoring former President DeCarlo. In 1998, the entire structure was renovated, an addition was built by the architects Buttrick White & Burtis, and the new complex took on its current official name. Today, it houses primarily a café serving on-the-go food, as well as two TV lounges.
 The Tea House, also known as the "Tea Haus", because its façade evokes German architectural motifs, was originally a gazebo built by the Lawrence family on a small rocky hill on the north lawn of their estate. After being saved by a student petition from a demolition that was called for by architect Philip Johnson in 1960, it was converted to an enclosed building with large windows and a fireplace that now houses a café selling a variety of teas and baked goods. While it is a fact that the building housed the office of history faculty member Charles Trinkaus from the 1950s through 1970, there seems to be no evidence to support the persistent campus rumor that the Tea House was once the office of long-time faculty member Joseph Campbell.

Administration buildings
 Andrews Annex, built in the 1990s adjacent to Andrews House, houses a number of administrative offices.
 Lyles House is home to the college's Health Services Center.
 The President's House, built in 1921 and designed by architect Louis Bowman of McKim, Mead & White, is an example of 16th century Tudor-style architecture. Its living room features restored carved beams, representing the various trades, from a 16th-century Tudor mansion in England. Additionally, above the mantel a Christian creation story is told in intricate wood carving. Campus legend dictates that a secret panel exists in the living room leading to a wine cellar, which was built during Prohibition. The President's House has housed the college's presidents since 1954, when the first President's House, located north of campus, was demolished to make way for the Sprain Brook Parkway.
 Robinson House on Mead Way is home to the college's communications department. Until 1952, it housed "The Caf", a student coffee shop, on its main floor.
 Westlands is primarily an administrative building, but its top floor houses a number of student living spaces. Completed in 1917, it is the oldest building on campus and was home to Sarah Bates Lawrence and William Van Duzer Lawrence before being given to the college. Dynamically situated at the highest point of elevation on the campus, it is another example of English Tudor architecture by Bates & How. When completed the home was pictured on the front page of the New York Times. It has been the heart of the campus throughout the history of the college and, owing to its massive size, it now houses the president's offices, the Office of Admission, the Office of Financial Aid, the Office of the Registrar, the Office of International Programs, the Career Counseling Office, the offices of all of the college's deans, and a number of meeting spaces in addition to the top-floor dorms.
 The Wrexham Road Property, acquired by the college in 2004, is a large manor house that once belonged to the government of Rwanda and used as a home for its consul. The building currently houses various graduate-level programs.

Housing
 Andrews House, a former manor house purchased for $200,000 by the college in 1935 from Arthur Lawrence, a son of the college's founders, is known for its high ceilings, fireplaces, and its spiraling main staircase. The house is designed in the Germantown Colonial Style by architect Penrose Scott. The majority of the building houses students, but it is also the home of the college's Department of Operations and Facilities and to the offices of Writing faculty.
 Andrews Court refers to the twelve cottage-style buildings to the south of Andrews House. Built in 1974, the buildings have, on average, about eight units each in addition to full kitchens, living rooms, and bathrooms.
 Tweed, a former manor house, is home to a number of large dorm rooms in addition to a pair of classrooms.
 Curtis is home to a number of dorms, and is also part of the Early Childhood Education complex.
 Lynd House, another former mansion, is home to mostly living spaces. The building's adjacent carriage house has been converted into student housing.
 Hill House, bought by the college in the late 1990s, is a seven-story apartment building on the extreme southern end of the campus. At present, the majority of the apartments in the building are occupied by students, but a number of them remain in the possession of the original tenants who occupied them when the building was purchased by Sarah Lawrence. Most of the apartments are quite large and each has a full kitchen. Apartments on the upper floors with south-facing windows have, on clear days, a view of the Empire State Building.
 Kober is home to dorm rooms, but is also a part of the Early Childhood Education complex. It was donated to the college in 1951 by Otto Frohnknecht in memory of his daughter, Margaret Frohnknecht Kober, who graduated from Sarah Lawrence in 1935. There was once a bowling alley in its basement.
 Morrill is the former maid's quarters to the President's House, and now is home to faculty offices.
 Slonim House was formerly a manor house that is now occupied by dorms and by the college's Center for Continuing Education and Office of Graduate Studies.
 Slonim Woods is the group of 10 purpose-built living facilities constructed in 1977. They consist of eight single person dorm rooms arranged around a central communal living space.

Old dorms
The "Old dorms" refer to four original purpose-built student housing structures to the immediate north of Westlands in what is frequently referred to as the "central campus". Dudley Lawrence, one of the sons of William and Sarah Lawrence, achieved the remarkable feat of constructing three of these buildings in one year (1926–1927). The halls were designed by William Augustus Bates, who repeated the Neo-Tudor style of Westlands through the use of stone and timber materials, and mansard roofs. The interiors are also in keeping with the English Tudor architectural style found on most of the older buildings in the area, with thick plaster walls, hardwood floors, and leaded windows (since replaced with more energy-efficient double-pane windows). MacCracken, built a few years later than the other three, is situated to the south of Dudley Lawrence. The original elegant living rooms that were found in each building, excepting MacCracken, are now used as classrooms.
 Dudley Lawrence, houses two classrooms in addition to living spaces. It is named for William Lawrence's son, who oversaw the construction of the Old Dorms.
 OSilas, originally named Gilbert for one of the college's original trustees, is the northernmost building of the four and is known for being quiet and populated with the college's more studious set.
 MacCracken, named for Vassar College president Henry Noble MacCracken, is a few years younger than its neighbors and has, at various times, housed the college library, the bookstore, and a number of other facilities in addition to living spaces. Although it still serves as a dormitory, it now also houses dance studios, meeting spaces, and administrative offices.
 Titsworth is an all-girls dorm and was also named for one of the college's founding trustees. It occupies the space between Gilbert and Dudley Lawrence and is also home to the Titsworth Lecture Hall.

New dorms

Designed by the renowned architect Philip Johnson in the sparse modernist style of the time, the "New Dorms" were completed in 1960. The architectural style of the buildings is meant to be a modernist reflection of the three older dorms (Gilbert, Titsworth, and Dudley Lawrence) that stand on the opposite side of the North Lawn. The three buildings that comprise the New Dorms are connected by two glass atria in which the buildings' primary stairwells are found. With the exception of the large apartments in Rothschild, these dorms typically house first-year students.
 Rothschild comprises apartment style, air-conditioned dorm spaces with kitchens, living rooms, and an elevator. The basement houses a number of small classrooms and studios in use predominantly by the theater department.
 Garrison is a traditional dormitory-style building with shared bathrooms.
 Taylor is nearly a replica in the design of its neighbor, Garrison.

The Mead Way houses
The Mead Way Houses are the eight former private homes that stand along the steep hill of Mead Way on the college's eastern end. The two southernmost houses, Robinson and Swinford, are occupied by administrative offices and the office of the campus internet radio station, and the northernmost six houses, listed below, are reserved for student living spaces. The northern houses include:
 Brebner House
 Mansell House
 Morris House
 Perkins House
 Schmidt House
 Warren Green House

Athletics
Sarah Lawrence College is the member of Skyline Conference of NCAA Division III. The college sponsors intercollegiate teams in crew (rowing), men's and women's cross country, equestrian, men's basketball, men's and women's tennis, men's and women's volleyball, men's and women's soccer, women's softball, and men's and women's swimming. In March 2011, the college announced that it would seek membership as a Division III member of the NCAA. The college began competing as a full member of Division III in the 2015–16 academic year after receiving a waiver to the required four-year 'provisional' period.

The college left the Hudson Valley conference after the 2013–14 season and joined the Skyline Conference beginning with the 2014–15 season. The Skyline Conference contains several schools including SUNY Purchase and Yeshiva University which have played against Sarah Lawrence regularly over the past few years.

The college's official mascot is a Gryphon by the name of Godric. It was chosen in the 1990s to represent the college's athletic teams after a long period of fielding sports teams without one. Unofficially, the student body had long adopted the large resident population of 'Black Squirrels' as a de facto mascot to the college. The position of silent mascot that the 'Black Squirrel' occupied was financially endorsed by the college itself with the production of various Black Squirrel merchandise (including Sarah Lawrence clothing branded with the Black Squirrel image) and plush toys. It is only recently (post-2003) that efforts on the behalf of the college to establish the Gryphon as the icon of Sarah Lawrence have begun to take root.

Notable people

Faculty 
Among the prominent current or recent faculty of the college are fine art photographer Joel Sternfeld, poet Suzanne Gardinier, novelist Melvin Jules Bukiet, novelist William Melvin Kelley, novelist Tao Lin, poet Marie Howe, film historians Gilberto Perez and Malcolm Turvey, puppet-theatre artist Dan Hurlin, dancer/choreographer Sara Rudner, Jewish historian Glenn Dynner, philosopher Michael Peter Davis, and economist Franklin Delano Roosevelt III. In 2005, current faculty member Eduardo Lago won the oldest literary prize in the Spanish-speaking world, the Premio Nadal. In 1934, Joseph Campbell was offered a position as a professor at Sarah Lawrence College which he held until his retirement in 1972. Perceptual psychologist Rudolf Arnheim was on the faculty at Sarah Lawrence College for 26 years, beginning in 1943. Author Grace Paley taught at Sarah Lawrence for many years. Novelist and folklorist Heinz Insu Fenkl taught at the college at the beginning of his career. Argentinian choreographer Anabella Lenzu, work in New York City, is an adjunct professor teaching modern, ballet, and dance history. Randall Jarrell taught at Sarah Lawrence College following military service in World War II. Jarrell's 1954 novel Pictures from an Institution, an academic satire, is set at fictional Benton College, which some saw as modeled on Sarah Lawrence College.

Entertainment industry and performance arts 
Sarah Lawrence alums who have entered the entertainment industry include film directors J. J. Abrams, Brian De Palma, Jordan Peele, producer Joshua D. Maurer, Laura Bickford, news personality Barbara Walters, and TV writer and author Noah Hawley.
It was also referenced in the 1981 crime drama movie Fort Apache, The Bronx as a place of alibi for the 100 or so South Bronx residents who were brought to the 41st Precinct for questioning about the murders of the two rookie officers at the film's post-opening credits start. Notable actors include Jane Alexander, Sigourney Weaver, Larisa Oleynik, Cary Elwes, Sam Robards, Joanne Woodward, Téa Leoni, Golden Brooks, Eric Mabius, Melora Hardin, Andrew Lawton, Yancy Butler, Holly Robinson Peete, Robin Givens, Julianna Margulies, Lauren Holly, Max Bemis, Tovah Feldshuh, Kyra Sedgwick, Elisabeth Röhm, Guinevere Turner, Jill Clayburgh and Alice Pearce. Carrie Fisher attended Sarah Lawrence, but left prior to graduating to begin filming Star Wars. Musicians include Yoko Ono, JD Samson, Lesley Gore, Carly Simon, jazz singer Stacey Kent, Slothrust, and Ira Kaplan of Yo La Tengo. Win Butler of Arcade Fire attended Sarah Lawrence but left after his first year to move to Canada. Dylan Brody, a humorist, author, and playwright, studied theater at Sarah Lawrence. Peter Gould, writer and producer of Breaking Bad, attended Sarah Lawrence. Charles Boyle, a fictional character from the series Brooklyn Nine-Nine, attended and graduated from Sarah Lawrence.
 Fine Arts — Alumni who are successful artists include Janine Antoni (sculptor and performance artist), Cady Noland (conceptual sculptor and installation artist), Judith Inglese (artist, ceramic muralist and children's book illustrator), Jedd Novatt (sculptor and painter), Alice Brock (artist and retired restaurateur, of "Alice's Restaurant" fame), and Yoko Ono (artist, performance artist and musician) who studied music.
 Dance — Alumni of the dance department at the college include MacArthur Genius Grant awardee Meredith Monk, Fulbright Scholar recipient Robin Gee, and choreographer John Jasperse.

Politics 
Alumni involved in politics include Amanda Burden, Director of City Planning for New York; Sharon Hom, Director of Human Rights in China; and two former members of the United States House of Representatives: Democrat and President Barack Obama's former Chief of Staff and Mayor of Chicago Rahm Emanuel; and former Republican Congresswoman Sue W. Kelly.

Fashion 
Vera Wang, fashion designer and former Vogue editor, and Paul Johnson Calderon, television personality and fashion journalist, attended Sarah Lawrence.

Literature and biography 
Alice Walker, the author of The Color Purple, is an alumna. Ann Patchett, author of Bel Canto, is a graduate, as is Donna Raskin, book author and magazine writer; Constance Cappel, author; and Louise Glück, a poet and winner of the Pulitzer Prize and the 2020 Nobel Prize in Literature. Alumna Nancy Huston is the author of numerous works and recipient of the Prix Femina in 2006 for the novel Lignes de faille (English translation: Fault Lines).
 Elizabeth Eslami, Iranian American essayist, novelist, and short story writer.
 Melissa Febos, award-winning author of Whip Smart, Abandon Me, and the national bestseller, Girlhood, is a graduate of the MFA program.
 Carolyn Ferrell, short story writer and novelist.
 Maggie Haberman, author and Pulitzer Prize-winning reporter.
 Randa Jarrar, Arab-American writer and professor at Fresno State University.
 Porochista Khakpour, Iranian American journalist, essayist, and novelist.
 Playwright and lyricist David Lindsay-Abaire won the 2007 Pulitzer Prize for Drama for his play Rabbit Hole.
 Derek B. Miller, novelist and author of Norwegian by Night, The Girl in Green, and American by Day.
 Isaac Oliver, author of Intimacy Idiot, playwright, and comic.
 Julie Shigekuni, novelist and professor at the University of New Mexico, MFA graduate.
 Brandon Shimoda, poet and author of several books including one that won the William Carlos Williams Award from the Poetry Society of America.
 Marguerite Yourcenar taught French and Italian there in the 1940s.
 Deborah Feldman, author of several books including Unorthodox: The Scandalous Rejection of My Hasidic Roots and Exodus: A Memoir. The Netflix mini-series Unorthodox was loosely based on Feldman's biography.

References

External links

 
 Official athletics website

 
1926 establishments in New York (state)
Education in Yonkers, New York
Educational institutions established in 1926
Former women's universities and colleges in the United States
Liberal arts colleges in New York (state)
Private universities and colleges in New York (state)
Progressive colleges
Universities and colleges in Westchester County, New York